Marvel: Future Fight is a 2015 superhero-themed mobile video game developed by Netmarble Games.

Gameplay

Plot
The collapse of several dimensions prompts investigations from Thor, Black Bolt, and Black Panther. After battling alternative versions of themselves, they inform Nick Fury. Meanwhile, Captain America, Black Widow, and Iron Man defend Stark Tower from an attack by Ultron. In the attack, it is revealed that Stark Industries employee Jemma Simmons is kidnapped by Advanced Idea Mechanics (AIM). After she is saved, the heroes encounter alternative versions of many heroes and villains on a search for MODOK. They conclude A.I.M. has built a device to send people between dimensions.

MODOK is defeated and reveals he was researching Ultron by summoning his dimensional alternates before Red Skull stole the dimension transporter. After this event, SHIELD agents begin to be attacked by thugs with advanced weaponry. The group of heroes fight them off and chase after Red Skull and Hydra, who is defeated alongside Ultron. An interdimensional transference device opens between time, and the future versions of themselves appear. They too are defeated, and a dimensional split occurs. After that heroes defeat Inhumans and Loki and proceed on to meet Dr. Simmons.

Doctor Strange explains that Dr. Simmons and he have homed in on an energy signal similar to the convergence device lost in the battle against Ultron. The team believes that it is the Ultimates working to solve the problem of the dimensions collapsing. When they arrive at the Ultimates HQ - The Triskellion, they are confronted by the defense systems drones and a skeptical Black Panther who believes they are from another dimension. After overpowering Black Panther and assuring him of their identity they proceed on to meet Blue Marvel who is working on the device to seal the dimension rifts. Suddenly they realize that the Triskelion has gone in full lockdown. Anti-Man and another dangerous inmate, detained by the Ultimates had escaped containment. At this point the team is curious to know who the other inmate is, demanding answers they find it is Thanos, the Mad Titan. With the help of Jemma Simmons, the team comes up with a means to track Thanos's chronal signature.

With the addition of Carol Danvers, heroes pursue Thanos, but they are greeted by Anti-Man. Hearing Thanos's false promises to Anti-Man for a better future, Tony and Adam Brashear are able to piece together Thanos' true intentions. In order to please Death, he intends to use the convergence device to open a rift to the future and destroy reality using the unstable Anti-Man. The heroes are able to defeat and reason with Anti-Man, bringing him back under control. They then proceed to stop Thanos from opening the rift. A battle ensues and as they are about to beat Thanos, he manages to slip through the rift into an unknown point in the future. The team is forced to follow to stop Thanos from destroying the future.

Release 

Marvel: Future Fight was released on April 30, 2015, for iOS and Android. It was developed by Netmarble Games, creators of titles such as Star Wars: Force Arena, Seven Knights, Raven (Evilbane in the U.S.) and Everybody's Marble. Marvel worked closely with Netmarble to establish the various character backgrounds, appearances and traits. The storyline for the game was penned by best-selling Marvel comics writer Peter David.

Marvel: Future Fight surpassed 50 million downloads two years after it first launched. 20 million of these downloads came from Asia, 10 million from North America and Europe, 6 million from South America and 2.9 million in the Middle East.

As of May 2018, the game had over 70million players.

References

External links 

 Marvel: Future Fight on Marvel Comics

2015 video games
Android (operating system) games
Free online games
IOS games
Multiplayer and single-player video games
Role-playing video games
Superhero crossover video games
Video games based on Marvel Comics
Video games about parallel universes
Netmarble games
Video games developed in South Korea
Video games set in New York City